Colostygia aptata is a moth of the family Geometridae first described by Jacob Hübner in 1813. It is found in most of the Palearctic realm.

Adults are on wing from July to August.

The larvae feed on Galium species. Larvae can be found from August to June. It overwinters in the larval stage.

References

External links

Lepiforum e.V.

Cidariini
Moths of Europe
Taxa named by Jacob Hübner